Tadej Ferme (born October 17, 1991 in Celje, Slovenia) is a Slovenian professional basketball player for Helios Suns of the Slovenian League. He is a 1.86 m tall Guard.

Professional career
Ferme started playing professional basketball for Šentjur.

In September 2013, Ferme signed with Zlatorog Laško. In December, 2013, he parted ways with Zlatorog Laško and signed with Maribor Nova KBM for the rest of the season.

In July 2014, he signed with Rogaška.

In July 2017, Ferme signed a two-year deal with Sixt Primorska. He rejoined Rogaška in 2019 and averaged 14.2 points and 3.2 assists per game. On July 1, 2020, Ferme signed with Helios Suns.

References

External links
 Eurobasket.com profile
 Pepi sport profile

1991 births
Living people
KK Zlatorog Laško players
KK Šentjur players
Point guards
Shooting guards
Slovenian men's basketball players
Helios Suns players